Solomon F. Sopher is the president of the Baghdadi Jewish community in Mumbai, India. He also serves as the Trustee of the David Sassoon Fund, and as the chairman and managing director of Sir Jacob Sassoon Trust, which manages the Knesset Eliyahoo synagogues in Mumbai, as well as the Magen David and the Ohel David synagogues at Pune, India.

Institutional activities
Solomon Sopher is also involved as a trustee and the Chairman of various other Jewish institutions like E.E.E. Sassoon High School, Sassoon Guest House, David Sassoon Library, Lady Rachel Sassoon Dispensary, Sassoon Dock, Indian Jewish Federation, etc. He is known as a very prominent and active Jewish leaders of recent days. He made possible bringing the most well-known celebrities including recent Prime Minister of Israel Benjamin Netanyahu, Ehud Olmert, Ehud Barak, the late Yitzhak Rabin, Indian Politicians Sonia Gandhi, Sharad Pawar, Manohar Joshi, Balasaheb Thakeray, Dr. Zakir Hussain, celebrities like pop singing diva Madonna, Britney Spears, Michael Jackson, Rachel Bilson, Kate Winslet and many others to the Synagogue where he is involved.

Charitable activities
Solomon Sopher is involved with various charitable organizations and Trusts for the needy. His trust is open for people from all religions and castes. Solomon's Synagogue of Mumbai and Pune are well-known heritage properties of the country.

See also
 Synagogues in India

External links
Kosher certification granted by Solomon Sopher
Kosher certification granted by Solomon Sopher
Kosher certification granted by Solomon Sopher

References
A REPORT ON MY VISIT TO INDIA by Mordechai Ben-Porat
Israeli advisory has put Indian Jewish community on alert - DNAIndia.com

Indian Jews
Iraqi Jews
Baghdadi Jews
Marathi people
People from Baghdad
Indian people of Iraqi-Jewish descent
Living people
Year of birth missing (living people)